Taconic Golf Club is a semi-private golf course located in Williamstown, Massachusetts.  The land that Taconic Golf Club is owned by Williams College, but an independent Board of Directors oversees the daily operation.  The course has repeatedly made Golf Magazine's list of the Top 100 Courses You Can Play and Golfweek's list of top collegiate campus courses, where it was most recently ranked 3rd in 2020. Golf Digest ranks Taconic as the 9th best course in the state of Massachusetts.

History
In 1896, William Howard Doughty, James M. Ide, and Edward C. Gale received permission from Williams College to install three tomato cans on land adjoining what is now the 18th fairway of Taconic.  In the same year, the course was expanded to seven holes; one of those holes, the present 17th, is the oldest at Taconic. In 1897, a longer nine-hole course was laid out.

In 1927, Wayne Stiles of Stiles & Van Kleek, a Boston firm, was commissioned to design and construct an 18 hole course.  Construction began in August 1927 and a par 73 layout was completed by Labor Day in 1928. The course was revised in 1955 to a 6,640 yard (gold tees) par 71 layout.  In 2009, Gil Hanse completed a renovation of the course.

Course layout
Many of the greens are located on top of knolls or small hills. In general, the course provides plenty of room off the tee, with the real challenge being ahead at the green. The greens are often fast, with significant slope from back to front, and it is usually preferable to remain short of the hole rather than beyond the flag stick.

Scorecard

Tournaments hosted

U.S. Junior Amateur
In 1956, Harlan Stevenson of California defeated Jack Rule, Jr. of Iowa 3 and 1. Rule beat 16-year-old Jack Nicklaus in the semifinals 1 up.  Nicklaus made a hole-in-one on the 14th hole at Taconic during a practice round, where an engraved rock commemorates this accomplishment.

References

External links
Taconic Golf Club Official Site

Buildings and structures in Berkshire County, Massachusetts
College golf clubs and courses in the United States
Golf clubs and courses in Massachusetts
Sports in Berkshire County, Massachusetts
Tourist attractions in Berkshire County, Massachusetts
Williams Ephs
1896 establishments in Massachusetts